Established in the United Kingdom in 1959 the Neonatal Society is the world's oldest learned society for the promotion of neonatal science. It is composed of both scientists and clinicians working in the area of the fetus and newborn.

The archives of the organisation are deposited at the Wellcome Library.

President and Past Officers
Andrew Ewer is the current president of the organisation, with James Boardman as the immediate past president.

Previous presidents  include:
 Howard Clark
 David Hull
 Robert McCance
 Neena Modi, the former president of the British Medical Association and the Royal College of Paediatrics and Child Health
 Peter Tizard 
 Elsie Widdowson 
 Andrew Wilkinson
 Maureen Young

Thomas Stapleton was a founder member of the organisation.

Membership
There are two main memberships available for the Neonatal Society: Ordinary Membership and Trainee Membership.  Honorary Membership may be offered to persons who have made notable contributions to the study of the newborn.

References

Neonatology
Scientific organizations established in 1959
Learned societies of the United Kingdom